Great Gable are an Australian indie rock band formed in Bunbury, Western Australia in 2014. The band consists of Alex Whiteman (lead vocals, guitar), Matt Preen (lead guitar), Chris Bye (bass guitar), and Callum Guy (drums). Brandon Richards previously performed as the band's bass guitarist until his departure from the band in 2017.

Their 2020 singles, "All My Friends", "Blur" and "Tracing Faces" were added to rotation on national youth broadcaster Triple J. They released their debut album Tracing Faces on 7 August 2020, which peaked at number 78 on the ARIA Albums Chart.

Their musical style consists primarily of indie rock, rock and alternative rock, with occasional reggae and blues influences.

Band members
Current members
 Alex Whiteman – lead vocals, rhythm guitar (2014–present)
 Matt Preen – lead guitar (2014–present)
 Chris Bye – bass guitar (2017–present)
 Callum Guy – drums (2015–present)

Past members
 Brandon Richards – bass guitar (2015–2017)

Career

2016–2018: Formation, GG, and Modern Interactions
Lead vocalist Alex Whiteman and lead guitarist Matt Preen became friends at the age of 12 or 13 whilst playing cricket competitively. In late 2014 in Bunbury, Western Australia, Preen and Whiteman decided to form a band, deciding to name it Great Gable. They had decided to form a band after "jamming" together. In mid-2015, Whiteman met drummer Callum Guy and bass guitarist Brandon Richards at the Western Australian Academy of Performing Arts (WAAPA), and asked the duo to join the band. Guy has since stated he thought "[Alex's] voice was awesome".

On 7 March 2016, Great Gable released their debut single, "Only for You", as the lead single from their debut extended play, GG. On 11 May, they released GG independently. All tracks were co-written by Preen, Whiteman, Guy and Richards. On 29 January 2017, they released "Early Morning" as the lead single from their second independent EP, Modern Interactions. On 31 August 2017, the band released Modern Interactions. Callum's friend, bass guitarist Chris Bye joined the band in late 2017.

On 25 July 2018, they released "Pillars", the lead single from their third EP, Lazy Bones Tapes. On 26 October, they released "Golden Slums", the second single from the EP. On 1 February 2019, they released "Cool Mind Blue", the third single from the EP. On 11 October 2019, they released "I Swear", the fourth and final single from the EP. Lazy Bones Tapes was released on 1 November 2019.

2019–2020: Lazy Bones Tapes and debut album Tracing Faces

On 13 February 2020, Great Gable signed with ADA Worldwide. On 21 February, they released "All My Friends", the lead single from their debut album. On 15 May, they released the single "Blur", alongside the announcement of their debut album, titled Tracing Faces. On 26 June, they released "I Wonder", the third single from Tracing Faces.

Tracing Faces was released on 7 August, with the title track being released as the album's fourth and final single on the same day. Tracing Faces peaked at number 78 on the ARIA Albums Chart in the week following its release.

2021–present: On the Wall in the Morning Light
On 9 September 2021, the band released the single "Hazy" and announced a 2022 Australian tour.

On 22 April 2022, Great Gable released "Dancing Shoes" and announced the forthcoming release of On the Wall in the Morning Light, scheduled for July 2022.

Musical style and influences
Great Gable are primarily an indie rock, rock, alternative rock, reggae, and blues band. In 2015, then-bass guitarist Brandon Richards described the band as having "strong reggae and blues influences."

The band list Matt Corby (who produced their debut album Tracing Faces) as a defining influence, and cite his albums Telluric and Rainbow Valley as specific influences. They have also described their music as being inspired by Jeff Buckley, Sticky Fingers, and the Clash.

They consider the records Revolver by the Beatles, AM by Arctic Monkeys, Kinfolk by Nate Smith and IV by BadBadNotGood to be significant musical influences of theirs.

Philanthropy
Great Gable have contributed to multiple social causes. Great Gable donated $1 of every ticket sale for their 2019 Australian tour towards solar initiative Future Energy Artists (FEAT. Artists). The band are also CanTeen Side of Stage ambassadors, an initiative which provides free tickets to shows for young people affected by cancer.

Discography

Studio albums

Extended plays

Singles

Awards and nominations

National Live Music Awards
The National Live Music Awards (NLMAs) are a broad recognition of Australia's diverse live industry, celebrating the success of the Australian live scene. The awards commenced in 2016.

! 
|-
! scope="row"| 2020
| Themselves
| West Australian Live Act of the Year
| 
| 
|}

Tours
Great Gable have performed at multiple festivals, including Groovin' The Moo, Falls Festival, SOTA Festival, On the House Festival and Outfield Festival. They have also supported Ocean Alley, the Jungle Giants, Thelma Plum, the Jezabels and Psychedelic Porn Crumpets on their respective national tours.

Headlining
 Pillars Tour (2018)
 Golden Slums Tour (2018)
 2019 Australia & New Zealand Tour (2019)
 Tracing Faces Tour (2020 – delayed from April to October due to COVID-19 pandemic)
 2022 Australian Tour

Supporting
 Psychedelic Porn Crumpets 2019 National Tour (2019)

Notes

References

External links
 
 

2014 establishments in Australia
Australian alternative rock groups
Australian blues rock groups
Australian indie rock groups
Australian reggae musical groups
Musical groups established in 2014
Musical groups from Perth, Western Australia